is located in the Hidaka Mountains, Hokkaido, Japan. The Mount Tsurugi Shrine route leads up to the peak.

References
 Shyun Umezawa, Yasuhiko Sugawara, and Jun Nakagawa, Hokkaidō Natsuyama Gaido 4: Hidaka Sanmyaku no Yamayama (北海道夏山ガイド4日高山脈の山やま), Sapporo, Hokkaidō Shimbunshya, 1991. 
 Geographical Survey Institute
 Google Maps

Tsurugi